Dejan Marković (Serbian Cyrillic: Дејан Марковић; born 26 May 1973) is a Serbian retired footballer who played as a right midfielder, and a current manager.

Football career
Marković was born in Zemun, Socialist Federal Republic of Yugoslavia. He started his senior career at the age of only 16 with FK Partizan, in the Yugoslav First League.

In January 1993 Marković moved to Spain where he remained for the following seven 1/2 seasons, in representation of UE Figueres, CD Logroñés and CA Osasuna. He competed in Segunda División with all the clubs and the second in La Liga, being relegated from the latter in 1995 and 1997.

Before retiring Marković played four years in Austria with FC Admira Wacker Mödling, and six in Switzerland with FC Naters. He acted as player-coach to the second side for the vast majority of his spell.

External sources
 
 
 PlayerHistory profile

1973 births
Living people
Serbian footballers
Association football midfielders
FK Partizan players
La Liga players
Segunda División players
UE Figueres footballers
CD Logroñés footballers
CA Osasuna players
Austrian Football Bundesliga players
FC Admira Wacker Mödling players
Serbian expatriate footballers
Expatriate footballers in Spain
Expatriate footballers in Austria
Expatriate footballers in Switzerland